Sarakina may refer to:
 Sarakina, Grevena, a village in Greece
 Sarakina, Thessaloniki, a village in Greece
 Sarakina, Trikala, a village in Greece, part of Kalampaka
 Sarakina Gorge, Crete